Hilarius Moa Nurak (21 February 1943 – 29 April 2016) was a Roman Catholic bishop.

Ordained to the priesthood in 1972, Moa Nurak served as bishop of the Roman Catholic Diocese of Pangkal Pinang, Indonesia, from 1987 until his death in 2016.

See also

Notes

1943 births
2016 deaths
21st-century Roman Catholic bishops in Indonesia
20th-century Roman Catholic bishops in Indonesia